The NAM Expressways is an expressway in Andhra Pradesh and Telangana states. It starts at Narketpalli in Telangana on NH 65 and ends at Medarametla in Andhra Pradesh on NH 16. It helped to reduce the distance from Hyderabad and Mumbai to Chennai. It has a total length of 212.5 kilometers. It is managed by Cube highways

History
The Project Road is 212.500 Km long and starts from Narketpalli in Telangana on NH 65 and ends at Medarametla in Andhra Pradesh on NH 16. The Project Road from 0.000 to 87.640 km  is in Telangana and from 87.640 to 212.500 km is in Andhra Pradesh. The road passes primarily through  plain terrain across Nalgonda district  of Telangana and Guntur and Prakasam Districts of  Andhra Pradesh. Approximately 83% of the corridor
is through rural areas. The major urban areas in the vicinity of the road are Damarcherla, Nalgonda, Piduguralla and Addanki. 

There are three toll plazas  at Madugulapally (TP1, chainage 41.125; Nalgonda district), Tummalacheruvu (TP2, chainage1 10.200; Guntur District) and Elchuru (TP3, chainage 168.200; Prakasam District).

The road received the provisional Certificate from the independent Engineer for 190.38 km of the road length in 2014. Subsequently, the allowable total toll length  is 203.8O5km with approvals granted in 2016, 2018 and 2020 for additional 13.425 km road length.

The construction work is pending for about 6 km of planned road length. The land acquisition for four-lane expansion of the road started in July 2011.  The land acquisition process for some part of the road is still ongoing. 

The road passes through 61 settlements in 37 revenue villages, located in 13 mandals across the three  districts of Nalgonda, Guntur and Prakasam. The total land requirement is 194.605 acres with 164.775 acree of private land and 29.83 acres of government land.

Out of 164.775 acree of private land, government hae completed land aoquisition process for 96.01 acres and handed over to NAMEL. The construction of road elements  located on the handed over  land is completed.

Route 

It passes through Nalgonda, Miryalaguda, dachepalli, Pidugurala and Addanki.

References

Expressways in Andhra Pradesh
Expressways in Telangana